Noble Igwe (born Noble Chibuzor Igwe ) is a Nigerian blogger, known for launching the entertainment platform 360 Group along with Tonia Soares and Oye Akdeinde.

Early life 
Igwe was born and raised in Aba, Abia State, where he finished his schooling at National High School Aba. He studied at St Augustine's Anglican Seminary Nbawsi; Federal Government College Okigwe and graduated from University of Nigeria, Nsukka. He later attended Pan Africa University.

Career
In 2009, Igwe started 360Nobs Limited. In April 2010, he launched 360nobs along with Oye Akideinde and Abimbola Soares.

Personal life
On June 11, 2016, Igwe married Chioma Otisi.
They welcomed their first child in January 2017.

See also
List of Nigerian bloggers

References

Igbo businesspeople
Living people
Nigerian editors
Nigerian magazine founders
21st-century Nigerian businesspeople
University of Nigeria alumni
Nigerian bloggers
1982 births